Polar Satellite Launch Vehicle – C39 was the forty-first flight of the PSLV series of launch vehicles on 31 August 2017. Launched in its XL configuration, the vehicle suffered a rare failure – the first failure after 24 years of operations when the heat shield failed to separate and the payload became trapped inside the heat shield and could not be deployed.

The mission

PSLV-C39 was supposed to launch the IRNSS-1H, the eighth satellite of the Indian Regional Navigation Satellite System (IRNSS). The launch was necessitated due to the failure of all the Cesium atomic clocks in one of the satellites of the constellation which rendered the navigation system non-operational. The rocket successfully lifted off from the launch pad and performed as expected for about 3 minutes, when the heat shield protecting the satellite during its ascent through the atmosphere was supposed to separate. Due to a malfunction of the pyro devices designed to explosively separate the heat shield, the satellite remained within the heat shield.

References

External links
 PSLV : Official ISRO Page
 India in Space PSLV page

Polar Satellite Launch Vehicle
Spacecraft launched by India in 2017
August 2017 events in India
Satellite launch failures